The 2018 Dubai Kabaddi Masters was a 6 nation Kabaddi Masters series which was held in the United Arab Emirates for 9 days from 22 June 2018 – 30 June 2018. This was also the inaugural edition of the tournament. This was the first international kabaddi sport event to be witnessed in the UAE. The tournament featured defending world champions India, Pakistan, Iran, Republic of Korea, Argentina and Kenya. India was regarded as the firm favourites to lift the inaugural Dubai Kabaddi Masters title. The tournament was hosted at the Al Wasl Sports Club in Dubai.

The opening encounter of the tournament was held between arch rivals India and Pakistan, the first rivalry match between these two teams since the 2016 Kabaddi World cup. India scored against Pakistan 36–20 in the opening match.

Before the commencement of the opening match of the tournament on 22 June Friday, the Pakistan team was scheduled to be arrived on 21 June, Thursday but their arrival to Dubai was delayed due to visa issues. The Indian Kabaddi team also played a warm-up match against their Asian rivals South Korea as a preparation to the tournament.

The current Indian Union sports minister and former professional shooter, Rajyavardhan Singh Rathore invited as the chief guest on the eve of the opening clash between India and Pakistan.

The inaugural edition of the Dubai Kabaddi Masters was organised by the International Kabaddi Federation affiliating along with the Dubai Sports Council and with Star India network. The broadcast rights were offered to Star India and the series was telecast through the Star Sports Network.

India defeated Iran 44–26 in the final to clinch the inaugural edition of the Dubai Kabaddi Masters tournament.

Format  
The six teams are divided into 2 groups of 3 teams. The teams in a group plays each other twice with the top two teams from each group qualifying for the knockout stages (semi-finals).

Group A 

report

Group B 

report

Schedule

1st Match

2nd Match

3rd Match

4th Match

5th Match

6th Match

7th Match

8th Match

9th Match

10th Match

11th Match

12th Match

Knockout stage

Semi-final

Final

Statistics

Top Raiders

 Pardeep Narwal (India) 40 points
 Jang kun Lee (South Korea) 34 points
 Rishank Devadiga (India) 28 points

Top Defenders

 Girish Ernak (India) 19 points
 Young Chan Ko (S.Korea) 16 points
 Surjeet Singh (India) 15 points

See also 
Kabaddi at the 2018 Asian Games – Men's tournament
Kabaddi at the 2018 Asian Games – Women's tournament

References 

2018 in kabaddi
2018 in Emirati sport
Kabaddi competitions in the United Arab Emirates
June 2018 sports events in Asia